Benjamin or Ben Turner may refer to:

Artists
Ben Turner (actor) (born 1980), British actor
Ben Turner (producer), co-founder of Fulwell 73
Benjamin Brecknell Turner (1815–1894), photographer

Politicians
Benjamin S. Turner (1825–1894), U.S. Representative from Alabama
Sir Ben Turner (politician) (1863–1942), Member of Parliament for Batley and Morley
Benjamin F. Turner Sr. (1873–1950), mayor of Passaic, New Jersey

Sportsmen
Ben Turner (weightlifter) (born 1984), Australian weightlifter
Ben Turner (footballer) (born 1988), English footballer 
Ben Turner (cyclist) (born 1999), British cyclist

Characters
Benjamin Turner, character in Cake
Bronze Tiger or Ben Turner, a fictional DC Comics character